Sam Wainwright (born 7 May 1998) is a Welsh rugby union player who plays as a prop for United Rugby Championship club the Scarlets. He is a Wales international, and has also appeared for the U20 team.

Club career
Wainwright began his career at local club Rhyl and District RFC before joining the North Wales regional side RGC 1404. He was signed by Saracens in May 2019, and made his debut against Wasps in the Premiership Rugby Cup on 21 September 2019. 

On 18 November 2022, Wainwright joined the Scarlets on a short term contract, until the end of the 2022–2023 season.

International career
Wainwright represented Wales U20.

He received his first call-up to the senior Wales side in June 2022, when he was added to the squad for the summer tour to South Africa in place of the injured Leon Brown. Wainwright came off the bench in the second test to make his debut, with Wales winning for the first time on South African soil.

Personal life

As a child, Sam Wainwright attended Prestatyn High School before attending Coleg Llandrillo.

References

External links
Profile at saracens.com
WRU Profile

1998 births
Living people
Welsh rugby union players
Rugby union props
Rugby union players from Denbighshire
Saracens F.C. players
RGC 1404 players
Ampthill RUFC players
Wales international rugby union players
Scarlets players